C1, C01, C.I or C-1 may refer to:

Arts and media
 C1, a note-octave in music
 C1 Television, a Mongolian television channel
 Schecter C-1 Hellraiser FR, a guitar model
 A Yamaha grand piano model
 "C1", a slang expression in the video game Counter-Strike, used to express agreement

Biology and medicine

Anatomy 
 Cervical vertebra 1, the first cervical vertebrae of the vertebral column
 Cervical spinal nerve 1, a spinal nerve of the cervical segment

Biochemistry 
 C1 complex, the first component of the classical complement pathway
 C1 domain, an important secondary messenger protein domain
 C1-inhibitor, a human serine protease inhibitor
 C1 regulatory sequence for the insulin gene
 Apolipoprotein C1, a human lipoprotein
 Chlorophyll c1, a form of chlorophyll
 Cytochrome C1, a precursor protein to Cytochrome C
 Proanthocyanidin C1, a type of polyphenolic compound
 Prostaglandin C1, a form of prostaglandins

Other uses in biology and medicine 
 C1 and P1 (neuroscience), a component of the visual evoked potential
 ATC code C01, a subgroup of the Anatomical Therapeutic Chemical Classification System
 C01, the ICD-10 code for "malignant neoplasm of base of tongue", a form of oral cancer
 C1, the short name for a microfluidic single-cell analysis system sold by Fluidigm

Chemistry
 C1 Chemistry, study of methane, methanol, carbon monoxide, carbon dioxide

Computing

Hardware
 C-One, a single-board microcomputer
 C1 NES TV, a family of Nintendo-television-set hybrids manufactured by Sharp Corporation in 1983
 ATI C1, codename of the Xbox 360 GPU Xenos

Other uses in computing
 C0 and C1 control codes defined in ISO 6429
 C1 (protocol), a 1984 protocol for file transfer, also known as "Punter"
 TCSEC C1 security class
 A CPU power state in the Advanced Configuration and Power Interface

Mathematics
 , the set of all continuously differentiable functions
 C1 field, a quasi-algebraically closed field
 C1, the first of four pure modules taken in the Advanced Level (UK) Maths syllabus

Transportation

Air
 C-1 Trader, a cargo-version of the S-2 Tracker anti-submarine warfare aircraft of the United States Navy
 AEG C.I, a German World War I reconnaissance aircraft
 AGO C.I, a 1915 German reconnaissance biplane
 Albatros C.I, a 1915 German two-seat general-purpose biplane
 Aviatik C.I, a 1915 German observation plane
 Cierva C.1, a 1920 Spanish experimental autogyro
 DFW C.I, a WWI German reconnaissance aircraft
 Douglas C-1, a cargo/transport airplane produced by Douglas Aircraft for the U.S. Army Air Service starting in 1925
 Fokker C.I, a 1918 German reconnaissance biplane
 Friedrichshafen C.I, a 1914 German single-engined amphibious reconnaissance biplane
 Hansa-Brandenburg C.I, a 1916 German 2-seater armed single-engine reconnaissance biplane
 Kawasaki C-1, an indigenous transport aircraft of the Japanese Air Self-Defense Forces
 Otto C.I, a 1915 German reconnaissance biplane
 Rumpler C.I, a 1915 German two-seater single-engine reconnaissance biplane
 Southern Cross Airport (New Jersey) (FAA LID: C01)

Land

Routes
 Circumferential Road 1 or C-1, an arterial road of Manila, Philippines
 London Buses route C1
 Route C1 (Shuto Expressway), the Inner Loop of Tokyo's Shuto Expressway system
 Claro M. Recto Avenue, a road in Metro Manila, Philippines
Massachusetts State Route C1

Land vehicles
 BMW C1, a cabin scooter
 Chevrolet Corvette C1, first generation sold from 1953 to 1962, denoted a solid-axle rear-end
 Citroën C1, a small car
 Ford C1 platform, the Ford Motor Company's global compact car automobile platform
 Lit C-1, a prototype cabin motorcycle
 Nimrod NRA/C1, a 1981 test design racing car
 Sauber C1, a Sauber sport car

Other uses in land transport
 C-1, the numberplate of the Prime Minister of Australia's official VIP transportation
 A type of heavy goods vehicle licence
 A one-way traffic sign in the Vienna Convention on Road Signs and Signals

Rail
 Bavarian C I, an 1847 German steam locomotives class
 GNR Class C1 (small boiler), a British 4-4-2 steam locomotive class (classified C2 during LNER ownership)
 GNR Class C1 (large boiler), a British 4-4-2 steam locomotive class
 LB&SCR C1 class, an 1882 British freight steam locomotive
 Long Island Rail Road C1, a bilevel railcar built by Tokyu Car Corporation
 NER Class C1, a British 0-6-0 steam locomotive class
 PRR C1, an American PRR steam locomotive
 Finnish Steam Locomotive Class C1

Sea
 , a C-class submarine of the Royal Navy
 , a C-class submarine of the United States Navy
 , a protected cruiser of the United States Navy
 Type C1 ship, a small cargo vessel built by the United States in large numbers before and during World War II
 Isaac Peral (C-1), a Spanish submarine

Space
 Cluster 1, also known as Rumba, an ESA satellite

Sports

 C1, a solo canoe discipline including sprint canoe and canoe slalom
 C1 (classification), a para-cycling classification
 C1, an abbreviation for Class One offshore powerboat racing
 'C1', the top category in Group C sportscar racing, used between 1985 and 1990
 C1, the UEFA Champions League (formerly known as the European Cup) in football
 Serie C1, the third highest football league in Italy until 2008

Other uses 
 C1, an international standard paper size defined in ISO 216 (648×917 mm)
 Bills C-1 and S-1, a pro forma bill normally introduced at the start of a parliamentary session in the Canadian House of Commons
 C1, also known as Vlakplaas, a unit of the South African Police responsible for assassinating opponents of Apartheid during the 1980s
 C1, a level in the Common European Framework of Reference for Languages
 C1, the use class for hotels, in town and country planning in the United Kingdom
 C1, a NRS social grade in the United Kingdom for the lower middle class
 a 2001 1.3 megapixels Olympus digital camera model
 a class of FM radio broadcasting in North America
 C1 pylon, a type of high voltage pylon
 Caldwell 1 (NGC 188), an open cluster in Cepheus
C-1 visa, a type of visa for individuals transiting through the United States

See also
 Cl (disambiguation)
 CI (disambiguation)
 1C (disambiguation)